WBMZ (103.7 FM) is a radio station broadcasting a classic hits format. Between the fall of 2011 and the spring of 2013, and again since the fall of 2014, WBMZ has served as the official flagship radio station for Georgia Southern Eagles athletics, broadcasting football, men's and women's basketball and baseball games along with weekly coaches' shows.

Licensed to Metter, Georgia, United States, the station serves the Metter, Statesboro, and Swainsboro areas. The station is currently owned by Dennis Jones, through licensee RadioJones, LLC, and features programming from ABC Radio  and Westwood One.

History
The station went on the air as WQKK on 4 July 1985. On 2 May 1988, the station changed its call sign to WHCG, on 12 June 1998 to WHCG-FM, and on 13 July 1998 to the current WBMZ.

WBMZ is hosted locally by Trey Dixon in the mornings and by station program director Steve Lawson in the afternoons.

References

External links

BMZ
Radio stations established in 1985
1985 establishments in Georgia (U.S. state)